Roberto Di Maio (born 21 September 1982 in Naples) is an Italian-born Sammarinese footballer who plays as a defender for San Marino Calcio.

Career

On 30 August 2010, he joined Nocerina for an undisclosed fee.

On 12 August 2013, he left Lecce for L'Aquila.

Di Maio has indicated that he would be likely to accept a call-up for San Marino national football team if asked.

References

External links

1982 births
Living people
Footballers from Naples
Italian footballers
Association football defenders
Serie B players
Serie C players
A.S.D. Victor San Marino players
U.S. Catanzaro 1929 players
A.S.G. Nocerina players
U.S. Lecce players
L'Aquila Calcio 1927 players
Campionato Sammarinese di Calcio players